Glostrup station is a commuter rail railway station serving the railway town/suburb of Glostrup west of Copenhagen, Denmark.

It is located on the Høje Taastrup radial of Copenhagen's S-train network. It is located close to the historical, administrative and commercial centre of Glostrup Municipality, but also serves Brøndbyvester in Brøndby Municipality, whose boundary comes within a few hundred metres from the station.

In front of the station is a major bus terminal from which local and express buses go in many directions.

The station is connected to the nearby Glostrup Shopping Center via an underground walkway, the same walkway which is used to access the platforms.

Glostup is one of the few remaining stations in Copenhagen that is an active rail freight destination. Sidings to industries west, south, and east of the station emerge from a small freight yard south of the long-distance tracks.

History
Glostrup was one of the original stations on the railway from Copenhagen to Roskilde that opened in 1847.

From 17 June 1953 to 26 May 1963 Glostrup was the western endpoint of the S-train network.
After the S-train line was extended to Taastrup in 1963, trains on the long-distance tracks ceased calling at Glostrup, but the long-distance platform was kept for use during disturbances in the service.

From 2000 to early 2005, direct regional trains between Roskilde and Copenhagen Airport stopped at the long-distance platform at Glostrup, but this service was ceased in order to free up capacity on the congested long-distance tracks.

Future
Construction has started on construction of the Ring 3 Light Rail, going from Lundtofte to Ishøj and pass by Glostrup station. It is planned to operate  in year 2025. There will be a stop for the Light Rail, and there are plans to build a new platform for regional trains along the mainline.

Cultural references
Both Glostrup station and the former goods terminal are used as locations in the 1975 Olsen-banden film The Olsen Gang on the Track. Glostrup station is for instance seen at 0:41:55 and again at 1:24:24.

See also
 List of railway stations in Denmark

References

S-train (Copenhagen) stations
Railway stations opened in 1847
Transport infrastructure completed in 1918
Buildings and structures in Glostrup Municipality
Heinrich Wenck buildings
1847 establishments in Denmark
Railway stations in Denmark opened in 1847
Railway stations in Denmark opened in the 19th century